Dora Rangelova (born 3 September 1967) is a retired tennis player from Bulgaria. On 15 August 1988, she reached her highest WTA singles ranking of 459. She played for Bulgaria Fed Cup team for three years.
Dora Rangelova is the current captain of the Bulgarian Fed Cup team. She's also the mother of tennis player Dimitar Kuzmanov.

ITF Circuit finals

Singles: 1 (1 runner–up)

Doubles: 1 (1 title)

References

External links

1967 births
Living people
Bulgarian female tennis players